Edmond Eliyahu Levy (October 11, 1941 – March 11, 2014) was an Israeli judge of the Supreme Court of Israel and member of the Judicial Selection Committee. In January 2012, he was appointed by Prime Minister Benyamin Netanyahu to head a three-member committee that was to examine the legal aspects of land ownership in the West Bank. The committee′s report, usually referred to as "Levy Report", was published in July 2012.

Biography
Levy was born in Basra, Iraq to supporters of the Herut movement. He emigrated to Israel with his parents at the age of 10. He grew up in Ramat Gan, where he finished high school in 1958. After his military service which ended in 1961, he began working at the Ramla Magistrate's Court and at the same time he studied statutory law at Tel Aviv University. He also served as Vice-Mayor of Ramla on behalf of the Likud party for a short time. In 1969 he finished his law studies, and opened his own office in Tel Aviv after he got his lawyer license in 1970. In 1977 he was appointed as a military judge, in 1979 as a Magistrate judge, and in 1984 he became District judge in Tel Aviv.

Levy was appointed to the Supreme Court in August 2001 along with Ayala Procaccia. The kippah wearing Levy was perceived as representing the Religious Zionists, complementing Procaccia′s secular views.

On 24 March 2008, Levy was elected by the Supreme Court justices to serve on the Judicial Selection Committee in place of the court's Vice-President Eliezer Rivlin.

In January 2012, he was appointed by Prime Minister Benyamin Netanyahu as head of a three-member committee dubbed the “outpost committee” to examine the legal aspects of land ownership in the West Bank and to review the 2005 government report known as the Sasson Report which had found that several dozen outposts were built without state approval and on privately owned Palestinian land. The 89-page report referred to as Levy Report was published by the Israeli government on 9 July 2012.

Legal views and rulings
Levy's main expertise was criminal law.   Among others, he presided over the highly publicized trial of Yigal Amir, the political assassin who murdered of Yitzhak Rabin, and made sure that the trial was a regular criminal trial, which was both praised and criticized.

He also wrote the ruling in Ze'ev Rosenstein's extradition to the United States, wherein he recognized the legality of extraditing an Israeli citizen who has committed offenses connected to the territory of a foreign country.

Levy was an activist judge, considered the most activist Supreme Court justice ever. He intervened in administrative and governmental decisions, including Knesset laws, when he thought it necessary, even in cases where the court usually does not get involved.

He was not afraid to hold the minority opinion, and wrote several court opinions as the single dissenting judge. He was the only judge who did not approve the slashes in the guaranteed income allowances, ruling "The right to live a dignified basic existence is an inseparable part of the right to human dignity". In his opinion, this right includes "the right to adequate living conditions and is not intended merely to keep a man from intolerable deprivation."  His humanity was also reflected in his verdict, revoking the practice of binding migrant workers to their employers. According to this practice, the workers lose their right to be in Israel once they leave their employers. "We must not turn their poverty into an instrument for uncontrolled, disproportionate infringement of basic rights," he ruled. "We, who know what it is like to be in exile and know what it is like to be a stranger, for we were strangers in the land of Egypt."

His most important verdict, according to Haaretz is his minority opinion against ten colleagues about the 2005 disengagement from the Gaza Strip: He wanted to annul the Evacuation-Compensation Law and the entire pull out.

References

External links
Edmond Levy at the official site for the Supreme Court of Israel

1941 births
2014 deaths
Deputy mayors of places in Israel
Israeli Jews
20th-century Israeli judges
Israeli people of Iraqi-Jewish descent
Israeli soldiers
Iraqi emigrants to Israel
Iraqi Jews
Judges of the Supreme Court of Israel
Likud politicians
People from Basra
Tel Aviv University alumni
21st-century Israeli judges